A thought-terminating cliché (also known as a semantic stop-sign, a thought-stopper, bumper sticker logic, or cliché thinking) is a form of loaded language, often passing as folk wisdom, intended to end an argument and quell cognitive dissonance. Its function is to stop an argument from proceeding further, ending the debate with a cliché rather than a point. Some such clichés are not inherently terminating; they only become so when used to intentionally dismiss dissent or justify fallacious logic.

The term was popularized by Robert Jay Lifton in his 1961 book Thought Reform and the Psychology of Totalism, who referred to the use of the cliché, along with "loading the language", as "the language of non-thought".

Origin and definitions 

The earliest recorded definition of the term was published in Robert Jay Lifton's book Thought Reform and the Psychology of Totalism in 1961 wherein he was describing the structure of language used by the Chinese Communist Party, defining the term as "the start and finish of any ideological analysis". It was listed as the sixth (of eight) totalistic themes. The term is written under the sixth (of eight) criteria for thought reform 'Loading the Language', of which various authors and scholars also consider the term to be a form of loaded language.

Charles "Chaz" Bufe in his book Alcoholics Anonymous: Cult or Cure? (1997) broadly put the use of the cliché as "thought-stopping phrases (that) include any use of the language, especially repeated phrases, to ward off forbidden thoughts" in describing his interactions with the Alcoholics Anonymous aid movement. Author, show-host and doctor Robert "Bo" Bennett described the term as a substitute for "a person's actual position or argument with a distorted, exaggerated, or misrepresented version of the position of the argument" in his 2017 book Logically Fallacious, along with a proposed logical form of the cliché; "Person 1 makes claim Y. Claim Y sounds catchy. Therefore, claim Y is true."

The Southern California law review, Volume 51, Part 1, describes the use of such clichés as "to capture the vehicles of thought and communication; 'Doctrine over reality' (which includes the rewriting of history and reinterpretation of one's past)" and as a property of 'ideological totalists'.

Bennett explains that exceptions are made to the use of phrases that would otherwise be considered thought-terminating, if they are used in addition to evidence or strong claims.

Examples 

"Lies of the devil." – Used as a response to any fact that threatens the integrity of an individual or group.
"Stop thinking so much." – Redirects attention from the topic, idea, or argument at hand to the alleged overuse of thought itself.
"It's all good." – Nullifies, without evidence, any possible debate by asserting the issue is already settled.
"Here we go again." – Implies that the redundant, cyclical nature of a given disagreement means it will never be resolved.
"So what? What effect does my action have?" – Used to dismiss an individual's involvement in a larger cause on the grounds that one person is too insignificant to ever have a meaningful impact.
"Fake news." – Used to negate the sources of an argument, often while providing alternate or misleading information to push an individual's own interpretation of a subject. Usage popularized by politicians in the US in 2016.

Criticism

Politics 
Two criticisms made by various journalists are that the cliché tends to halt debate and restrict or censor freedom of speech, or tends to be synonymous with language that would be used by totalitarian states as Lifton originally identified with Communist China. Chancellor Adolf Hitler of Nazi Germany is remarked to have employed such clichés and platitudes to justify his actions prior and during the events of World War II for example.

David Volodzko in The Diplomat in 2015 characterized China's justification for persecuting Tibetans, Uyghurs, Falun Gong, artists, journalists (including Liu Xiaobo), summed up as "for security reasons" as a thought-terminating cliché, going on to say "that's every bit as vapid as 'God moves in a mysterious way' or 'support our troops'. What it really means is that the Party is more important than the people."

Religion 
An example of the cliché in use provided by Chaz Bufe is "the admonition given to Catholic schoolchildren to recite the Hail Mary or rosary to ward off 'impure thoughts'. The use of repetitive chanting by the Hare Krishnas serves the same thought-stopping purpose." Christian author Ann Morisy criticized the Christian Church for their uses of such clichés coinciding with their doctrines that intentionally reduce the possibility of dialogue, stating that failure to move beyond them risks falling prey "to a new version of gnosticism" along with alienating those not of the faith. Scientology has also been criticized for using protocols, language and lexicons that use thought-terminating clichés to condition its members or to reaffirm a confirmation bias, which makes it difficult for members to think "outside the box". The Guardian journalist Jenna Scaramanga mentions that when certain members of Islam label something haram (sinful), that employs the use of the tactic since it states that something is forbidden and "There is no need for any more consideration of whether it is bad."

Commercials 
The use of slogans is often considered to be a form of the cliché: "Brief, reductive labels you can stick on things, and which end thought on the subject".

Art and media 
An article published by Gamasutra mentions that, during the debate regarding whether or not pornographic games should be available on the Steam market place, simply calling such games porn is "thought-terminating" as it does not progress debate.

Fictional applications 

George Orwell's Nineteen Eighty-Four – The totalitarian state Oceania implements Newspeak, a "pared-down version of English in which 'dangerous' words like 'freedom' no longer exist". Kathleen Taylor suggests in a case study that the words that remain as a result of the diminishing of the English language are ideologically loaded, and are "clear examples of Lifton's thought-terminating clichés".
Aldous Huxley's Brave New World – The "Utopian" Society uses thought-terminating clichés more conventionally, most notably regarding the drug soma as well as modified versions of real-life platitudes, such as, "A doctor a day keeps the jim-jams away."

See also 
 Fighting words
 Godwin's law
 Indoctrination
 Language in Thought and Action by S. I. Hayakawa
 Soundbite

References 

Barriers to critical thinking
Linguistic controversies
Political terminology
Propaganda techniques
Rhetorical techniques
Error